Wiremu Rikihana (1851 – 10 July 1933) was a New Zealand tribal leader and politician. Of Māori descent, he identified with the Te Rarawa iwi. He was born in Waireia, Northland, New Zealand, in 1851. On 1 June 1923, he was appointed to the New Zealand Legislative Council. He served until the end of his term on 31 May 1930.

Rikihana died at Kaihu on 10 July 1933.

References

1851 births
1933 deaths
Māori politicians
Members of the New Zealand Legislative Council
Te Rarawa people